Blakes is an unincorporated community in Mathews County, Virginia, United States.

Hesse was listed on the National Register of Historic Places in 1974.

References

Unincorporated communities in Mathews County, Virginia
Unincorporated communities in Virginia